The radio spectrum scope (also radio panoramic receiver, panoramic adapter, pan receiver, pan adapter, panadapter, panoramic radio spectroscope, panoramoscope, panalyzor and band scope) was invented by Marcel Wallace - and measures and shows the magnitude of an input signal versus frequency within one or more radio bands - e.g. shortwave bands. A spectrum scope is normally a lot cheaper than a spectrum analyzer, because the aim is not high quality frequency resolution - nor high quality signal strength measurements.

The spectrum scope use can be to:
 find radio channels quickly of known and unknown signals when receiving.
 find radio amateurs activity quickly e.g. with the intent of communicating with them.

Modern spectrum scopes, like the Elecraft P3, also plot signal frequencies and amplitudes over time, in a rolling format called a waterfall plot.

References

External links 
 
 K9rod.net: Spectrum Scope
 ac8gy.com: Panadapter for FT-950
 k2za.blogspot.dk: FT-817 Tip - Spectrum Scope
 portabletubes.co.uk: Panoramic Radio Products PCA-2 Panadapter
 Navy Receiving Panoramic Adaptor (Panadaptor) Info
 

Receiver (radio)
Radio electronics
Telecommunications equipment
Radio technology
Signal processing
Spectroscopy